Microhadrosaurus (meaning "small sturdy lizard" in Greek) is a genus of hadrosaurid dinosaur from the Campanian or Maastrichtian-age Upper Cretaceous Yuanpu Formation (also known as the Nanxiong Formation) of Guangdong, China.  Although its name identifies it as a small hadrosaur, it is based on juvenile remains, and the size of the adult hadrosaur is unknown.

Description
Dong Zhiming named this genus for IVPP V4732, a partial lower jaw from a juvenile hadrosaur.  This partial bone, with 18 columns of stacked teeth in a typical hadrosaur tooth battery, measures 37 centimeters long (15 inches). Dong later estimated the length of the individual at 2.6 meters (8.5 feet).

History
Dong regarded this genus as much like Edmontosaurus, albeit in tiny form. However, Michael K. Brett-Surman, a hadrosaur specialist, regarded the material as showing no characteristics that would allow it to be differentiated from other duckbills. The most recent review accepts Brett-Surman's position, and regards Microhadrosaurus as a dubious name.

Paleobiology
As a hadrosaurid, Microhadrosaurus would have been a bipedal/quadrupedal herbivore, eating plants with a sophisticated skull that permitted a grinding motion analogous to chewing, and was furnished with hundreds of continually-replaced teeth. Because it is only known from a partial jaw from a juvenile, little more than general information can be drawn from it at this point.

Paleoecology

Fauna and habitat
The Nanxiong Formation consists of a 2000-meter sequence of red sandstones and clays which has yielded dinosaur fossils, dinosaur footprints and abundant egg shells.  Microhadrosaurus shared its paleoenvironment with the sauropod Gannansaurus, the therizinosauroid Nanshiungosaurus, the tyrannosaurid Qianzhousaurus and the oviraptorids Banji, Jiangxisaurus, Corythoraptor, Ganzhousaurus, Huanansaurus, Nankangia and Tongtianlong.

See also

 Timeline of hadrosaur research

References

Hadrosaurs
Late Cretaceous dinosaurs of Asia
Taxa named by Dong Zhiming
Fossil taxa described in 1979
Ornithischian genera